The Governor was the leader of a county (maakond) in Estonia. Here is the list of governors of Estonian counties.

Harju County
Johannes Reinthal (1917–1920)
Oskar Suursööt (1920–1922)
Martin Kruusimaa (Krusemann) (1922–1927)
Rudolf Kuris (1927–1936)
Karl Robert Ruus (1936–1940)
Gustav Abel (1940–1941)
Paul Männik (1940; 1941–1944)
Anti Oidsalu (1990–1991)
Mati Zernand (1991–1994)
Mait Kornet (1994–1999)
Orm Valtson (1999–2004)
Jaan Mark (acting, 2005–2006)
Värner Lootsmann (2006–2009)
 Ülle Rajasalu (2009–2017)
 source

Hiiu County
Tarmo Mänd (1989–1994)
Tiit Laja (1994–1999)
 Hannes Maasel (1999–2012)
Piret Sedrik (acting, 2012)
Riho Rahuoja (2012–2017)

Ida-Viru County
?
 Rein Aidma (1994–2003)
 Ago Silde (2004–2007)
Riho Breivel (2007–2012)
Andres Noormägi (2013–2017)

Järva County
Jakob Sõnajalg (1919–1935)
Juhan Kaarlimäe (1937–1940)
Herman Lipp (1941–1944)
 Arvo Sarapuu (1989–1997)
Theo Aasa (1998–2003)
Üllar Vahtramäe (2004–2009)
Tiina Oraste (2009–2017)

Jõgeva County
Priit Saksing (1990–1994)
 Meelis Paavel (1994–1999)
Margus Oro (1999–2004)
Aivar Kokk (2004–2009)
Viktor Svjatõšev (2009–2017)

Lääne County
Aleksander Saar (1917–1927)
Artur Kasterpalu (1930–1941)
Karl Robert Ruus (1941–1944)
 Andres Lipstok (1989–1994)
Hannes Danilov (1994–1999)
Arder Väli (1999)
Maaja Toompuu (acting, 1999)
Jaanus Sahk (1999–2004)
Sulev Vare (2004–2007)
Maaja Toompuu (acting, 2007–2008)
Neeme Suur (2008–2011)
Innar Mäesalu (2011–2017)

Lääne-Viru County
Lembit Kaljuvee (1989–1992)
Ants Leemets (1992–1995)
 Marko Pomerants (1995–2003)
Riina Kaptein (acting, 2003–2004)
Urmas Tamm (2004–2009)
Einar Vallbaum (2009–2017)

Pärnu County
Jüri Marksoo (1920–1940)
Rein Kirs (?–1993)
Toomas Kivimägi (1993–2009)
Andres Metsoja (2009–2017)

Põlva County
Margus Leivo (1990–1993)
? (1993–1996)
Kalev Kreegipuu (1996–1998)
Mart Madissoon (1998–2003)
Urmas Klaas (2004–2007)
Priit Sibul (2007–2011)
Ulla Preeden (2011–2017)

Rapla County
Harri Õunapuu (1989–1991)
Kalle Talviste (1991–2003)
Tõnis Blank (2004–2009)
Tiit Leier (2009–2017)

Saare County
Ants Tammleht (1990–1991)
Jüri Saar (1992–2003)
Hans Teiv (acting, 2003–2006)
Toomas Kasemaa (2006–2011)
Jaan Leivategija (acting, 2011)
Kaido Kaasik (2011–2017)

Tartu County
Bernhard Methusalem (1944)
Robert Närska (1989–1992)
Kalju Koha (1992–1993)
Jaan Õunapuu (1993–2003)
Eha Pärn (acting, 2003–2004)
Eha Pärn (2004–2005)
Tõnu Vesi (acting, 2005–2006)
Esta Tamm (2006–2011)
Tõnu Vesi (acting, 2011)
Reno Laidre (2011–2017)

Valga County
Karl Robert Ruus (1930–1933)
Värdi Velner (1936–1940)
Värdi Velner (1941–1943)
Uno Heinla (1989–1992)
Rein Randver (1992–2003)
 Georg Trašanov (2003–2010)
Margus Lepik (2010–2017)

Viljandi County
?
 Helir-Valdor Seeder (1993–2003)
Kalle Küttis (2004–2009)
Lembit Kruuse (2009–2017)

Võru County
? (?–1993)
Tiit Soosaar (1993–1998)
 Robert Lepikson (1998–2000)
Mait Klaassen (2000–2004)
Ülo Tulik (2005–2010)
Andres Kõiv (2010–2017)

References

Lists of political office-holders in Estonia
Counties of Estonia